Emyl Leclercq (born 6 December 2002) is a Singaporean professional footballer who plays as a goalkeeper for Championnat National club Cholet. He was born in Singapore to French dad and Singaporean mom of Malay descent.

Career
A youth product of La Brède FC, Leclercq joined the youth academy of Chamois Niortais in 2017. He debuted for Chamois Niortais in a 2–0 Ligue 2 loss to LB Châteauroux on 3 October 2020. He signed for Championnat National club SO Cholet on 2 June 2021.

References

External links
 Chamois Niortais profile

2002 births
Living people
Sportspeople from Singapore
Singaporean footballers
French footballers
Association football goalkeepers
Chamois Niortais F.C. players
SO Cholet players
Ligue 2 players
Championnat National players
Singaporean people of French descent